OND may refer to:
Oblates of Notre Dame, a congregation of religious sisters originating in Mindanao, Philippines
Önd, an Old Norse term used to denote the mystical Odic force
One Note Database, an IBM Lotus Notes file
Opera Nazionale Dopolavoro, the leisure and recreational body of the Fascist Italy government
Ordinary National Diploma, former designation of BTEC Extended Diploma, a vocational qualification in the United Kingdom
Operation New Dawn (disambiguation), the operative name for the Iraq War after August 2010, or one of several other military operations